Oneillornis is a genus of passerine birds in the family Thamnophilidae. The species are native to the Amazon rainforest of South America.

The genus contains two species:

 White-throated antbird (Oneillornis salvini)
 Lunulated antbird (Oneillornis lunulatus)

These two species were at one time included in the genus Gymnopithys. They were moved to this newly erected genus based on the results of a molecular phylogenetic study published in 2014. The type species is the lunulated antbird.

These species are specialist ant-followers that depend on swarms of army ants to flush insects and other arthropods out of the leaf litter.

References

 
 
Bird genera